Notable people with the surname Bortz or Börtz include:
Bortz (chieftain), 13th-century Cuman chieftain
Analia Bortz (born 1967), Argentine medical doctor and rabbi
Chris Bortz (born 1973), American politician
Cindy Bortz, American figure skater
Daniel Börtz (born 1943), Swedish composer
Mark Bortz (born 1961), American football player
Rudolf Bortz (born 1938), German sports shooter
Walter Bortz II (born 1930), American researcher and medical doctor
Walter M. Bortz III, American university president